The Kantorovich theorem, or Newton–Kantorovich theorem, is a mathematical statement on the semi-local convergence of Newton's method. It was first stated by Leonid Kantorovich in 1948. It is similar to the form of the Banach fixed-point theorem, although it states existence and uniqueness of a zero rather than a fixed point.

Newton's method constructs a sequence of points that under certain conditions will converge to a solution  of an equation  or a vector solution of a system of equation . The Kantorovich theorem gives conditions on the initial point of this sequence. If those conditions are satisfied then a solution exists close to the initial point and the sequence converges to that point.

Assumptions 
Let  be an open subset and  a differentiable function with a Jacobian  that is locally Lipschitz continuous (for instance if  is twice differentiable). That is, it is assumed that for any  there is an open subset  such that  and there exists a constant  such that for any 

holds. The norm on the left is some operator norm that is compatible with the vector norm on the right. This inequality can be rewritten to only use the vector norm. Then for any vector  the inequality

must hold.

Now choose any initial point . Assume that  is invertible and construct the Newton step 

The next assumption is that not only the next point  but the entire ball  is contained inside the set . Let  be the Lipschitz constant for the Jacobian over this ball (assuming it exists).

Statement 
Now if  then 
a solution  of  exists inside the closed ball  and 

A statement that is more precise but slightly more difficult to prove uses the roots  of the quadratic polynomial
,

and their ratio 

Then
a solution  exists inside the closed ball 
it is unique inside the bigger ball 

The quadratic convergence is obtained from the error estimate

Corollary
In 1986, Yamamoto proved that the error evaluations of the Newton method such as Doring (1969), Ostrowski (1971, 1973), Gragg-Tapia (1974), Potra-Ptak (1980), Miel (1981), Potra (1984), can be derived from the Kantorovich theorem.

Generalizations
There is a q-analog for the Kantorovich theorem. For other generalizations/variations, see Ortega & Rheinboldt (1970).

Applications
Oishi and Tanabe claimed that the Kantorovich theorem can be applied to obtain reliable solutions of linear programming.

References

Further reading 
 John H. Hubbard and Barbara Burke Hubbard: Vector Calculus, Linear Algebra, and Differential Forms: A Unified Approach, Matrix Editions,  (preview of 3. edition and sample material including Kant.-thm.)
 

Functional analysis
Numerical analysis
Theorems in analysis
Optimization in vector spaces
Optimization algorithms and methods